The Breede Valley Local Municipality council consists of forty-one members elected by mixed-member proportional representation. Twenty-one councillors are elected by first-past-the-post voting in twenty-one wards, while the remaining twenty are chosen from party lists so that the total number of party representatives is proportional to the number of votes received. In the election of 1 November 2021 the Democratic Alliance (DA) obtained a plurality of nineteen seats on the council.

Results 
The following table shows the composition of the council after past elections.

December 2000 election

The following table shows the results of the 2000 election.

By-elections from December 2000 to October 2002
The following by-elections were held to fill vacant ward seats in the period between the election in December 2000 and the floor crossing period in October 2002.

October 2002 floor crossing

In terms of the Eighth Amendment of the Constitution and the judgment of the Constitutional Court in United Democratic Movement v President of the Republic of South Africa and Others, in the period from 8–22 October 2002 councillors had the opportunity to cross the floor to a different political party without losing their seats. In the Breede Valley council, four councillors from the Democratic Alliance (DA) crossed to the New National Party (NNP), which had formerly been part of the DA, and one councillor crossed from the DA to "Breedevallei Onafhanklik" (BO). One councillor crossed from BO to the African National Congress (ANC) and one crossed from BO to the NNP.

By-elections from October 2002 to August 2004
The following by-elections were held to fill vacant ward seats in the period between the floor crossing periods in October 2002 and September 2004.

September 2004 floor crossing
Another floor-crossing period occurred on 1–15 September 2004, in which four of the NNP councillors crossed to the ANC and one NNP councillor crossed to the DA.

March 2006 election

The following table shows the results of the 2006 election.

September 2007 floor crossing
The final floor-crossing period occurred on 1–15 September 2007; floor-crossing was subsequently abolished in 2008 by the Fifteenth Amendment of the Constitution. In the Breede Valley council, four councillors crossed from the Independent Democrats (ID) to the new National People's Party, two councillors left the African National Congress (ANC) to sit as independents, and the existing independent councillor joined the ANC.

By-elections from September 2007 to May 2011
The following by-elections were held to fill vacant ward seats in the period between the floor crossing period in September 2007 and the election in May 2011.

May 2011 election

The following table shows the results of the 2011 election.

August 2016 election

The following table shows the results of the 2016 election.

The local council sends five representatives to the council of the Cape Winelands District Municipality: three from the Democratic Alliance and one each from the African National Congress and Breedevallei Onafhanklik.

By-elections from August 2016 to November 2021 
The following by-elections were held to fill vacant ward seats in the period between the elections in August 2016 and November 2021.

November 2021 election

The following table shows the results of the 2021 election.

Notes

References

Breede Valley
Elections in the Western Cape
Cape Winelands District Municipality